The 2020–21 season was the 89th season in the existence of Stade de Reims and the club's third consecutive season in the top flight of French football. In addition to the domestic league, Reims participated in this season's edition of the Coupe de France and the UEFA Europa League. This was the Reims' first season since 1962–63 in the European football. The season covered the period from 1 July 2020 to 30 June 2021.

Players

First-team squad

Out on loan

Reserve team

Transfers

In

Out

Pre-season and friendlies

Competitions

Overview

Ligue 1

League table

Results summary

Results by round

Matches
The league fixtures were announced on 9 July 2020.

Coupe de France

UEFA Europa League

Statistics

Goalscorers

References

External links

Stade de Reims seasons
Reims
Reims